Kumage District may refer to:
 Kumage District, Kagoshima, Japan
 Kumage District, Yamaguchi, Japan